The Sunsphere located in World’s Fair Park in downtown Knoxville, Tennessee, is a  high hexagonal steel truss structure, topped with a  gold-colored glass sphere that served as the symbol of the 1982 World's Fair.

Design
Designed by the Knoxville-based architectural firm Community Tectonics, the Sunsphere was created as the theme structure for the 1982 World's Fair.  It was noted for its unique design in several engineering publications.

The World's Fair site later became a public park, the World's Fair Park, alongside Knoxville's official convention center and adjacent to the University of Tennessee's main campus. The Sunsphere remains standing directly across a man-made pond from the Tennessee Amphitheater, the only other structure remaining from the 1982 World's Fair.

The tower's window glass panels are layered in 24-karat gold dust and cut to seven different shapes. It weighs  and features six double steel truss columns in supporting the seven-story sphere.

History
During the fair it cost  to take the elevator to the tower's observation deck. The tower served as a restaurant and featured food items such as the Sunburger and a rum and fruit juice cocktail called the Sunburst. In the early morning hours on May 12, 1982, a shot was fired from outside the fair site and shattered one of the sphere's windows.  No one was arrested for the incident.

The Sunsphere has been used as a symbol for Knoxville, appearing in postcards and logos. Between 1993 and 1999, the Sunsphere was featured in part on the logo for the Knoxville Smokies minor league baseball club. The 2002 AAU Junior Olympics mascot Spherit took its inspiration from the landmark. It featured red hair and a body shaped like the Sunsphere. On Sunday, May 14, 2000, nuclear weapons protesters scaled the tower and hung a large banner that said "Stop the Bombs." They remained on the tower for three days before surrendering to police.

Redevelopment

In March 1991, officials from the Pensacola Tornados of the Continental Basketball Association were looking at Knoxville for possible location and said of the Sunsphere as potential office space, "What better place for basketball offices than a giant gold basketball in the sky."

A pair of failed proposals was presented to the World's Fair Park Development Committee on March 31, 1994, that sought to reopen the Sunsphere as a restaurant (similar to Seattle's Space Needle, which features a restaurant at the top of the tower). The proposal from CEB Enterprises would have opened a casual dining restaurant called World's Fare Restaurant. The proposal from Cierra Restaurant Group would have opened a fine dining restaurant.

The Sunsphere was proposed to be included as part of the new Knoxville Convention Center. While not physically incorporated into the final design, the Convention Center was designed with an open curve along its north edge to allow access to the Sunsphere. During construction of the Convention Center, the observation deck, which had been briefly reopened by the city (still sporting the original World's Fair-era displays and explanations of the panorama), was closed while the tower was commandeered by the Knoxville Public Building Authority as offices for, quite literally, overseeing the construction of the Convention Center.

Reopening
The Level 4 observation deck was reopened July 5, 2007, to give visitors a view of Knoxville. The observation deck can hold 86 people. At the time of its reopening, Level 5 became a cafe with concession and an early evening drinks service. Level 6 served as an open space leased out for functions. As of October 2013, both the 7th and 8th floors are available for commercial rental.

On August 27, 2008, the 5th floor was opened as the SkyBox bar and lounge. It eventually closed, however, and real estate investor Tony Capiello opened Icon Ultra Lounge in its place, investing $450,000.

In June 2013, a patron accidentally broke an inside window; nobody was hurt. On November 13, 2013, it was announced that Visit Knoxville would update and renovate the 4th floor of the observation deck.

The Sunsphere observation deck was closed in 2020 due to the Covid-19 Pandemic. 

On February 22, 2022, Visit Knoxville reopened the Sunsphere observation deck. The flood offers a breathtaking 360-degree view stretching from downtown to the Great Smoky Mountains including World’s Fair Park, the Tennessee River and the University of Tennessee Campus. A 1982 World’s Fair timeline, gallery, memorabilia and gift shop await visitors.
Admission is $5 per person and free for children under 12.

In popular culture
A March 1996 episode of The Simpsons, "Bart on the Road", features the Sunsphere. Bart and three friends (Nelson, Martin, and Milhouse) travel to Knoxville to visit the World's Fair, only to learn they are over a decade too late.  In the episode, the Sunsphere has become a dilapidated storage warehouse for a wig store called the Wigsphere. Nelson then throws a rock at the Sunsphere, causing it to topple over and land on top of their rental car, destroying it and stranding them in Knoxville.

The Sunsphere has also been called "The Lord's Golf Tee".

The Sunsphere was the subject of a song of the same name by rapper EG Money in 2022.

References

Further reading

External links 
 The Sunsphere (World's Fair Park website)

1982 establishments in Tennessee
buildings and structures completed in 1982
buildings and structures in Knoxville, Tennessee
buildings and structures with revolving restaurants
culture of Knoxville, Tennessee
restaurants established in 1982
restaurants in Tennessee
tourist attractions in Knoxville, Tennessee
towers in Tennessee
world's fair architecture in Tennessee
1982 World's Fair
Symbols of cities